2009 Championship 1 was a semi-professional rugby league football competition played in the United Kingdom, the third tier of the sport in the country. The winner of this league will be promoted to the Co-operative Championship. There is no relegation from this league as it is the lowest tier of professional rugby league in the UK.

2009 Structure

The Dewsbury Rams were easily the best team throughout the regular season. They won all their games and finished on top of the table, 12 points ahead of the second placed Keighley Cougars. The Rochdale Hornets were stripped of six competition points  for going into administration and had to be reformed by local fans .

Table 
Three points were awarded for a win, one point for a draw. Bonus points were awarded (one point per game) to losing teams where the margin of defeat was 13 points or less.

a: Rochdale were docked 9 points for going into administration.

Play-offs 
Championship 1 uses a top 6 play-off system.

Elimination semi-finals

Qualification and elimination matches

Final qualifiers

Grand Final

2009 Attendances 

– Crowd figures could not be found for all games.
– The final will be played at a neutral venue and thus will not be included in the averages of any team.

See also
 Co-operative Championship
 2009 Co-operative Championship
 RFL League 1

References

RFL League 1
Rugby Football League Championship
2009 in English rugby league